Cactus is a genus of anomopods in the family Macrothricidae. There is only one described species, Cactus cactus. C. cactus can be found in Chile.

References

Further reading

 
 
 
 
 

Cladocera